Tennessee Senate Bill 3, known as the Tennessee drag ban, is an anti-drag bill, which bans public "adult cabaret performance" in front of children in the state of Tennessee. The bill is vague in what it considers an "adult cabaret performance" although it defines it as a "male or female impersonators who provide entertainment that appeals to a prurient interest."

This bill was the first anti-drag bill to pass the state legislature in the United States, and was the first to be signed into law. The bill was signed on March 2, 2023, by governor Bill Lee. This bill has been variously described by its opposition as being overly vague and authoritarian.

Bill contents
Tennessee Senate Bill 3 bans "topless dancers, go-go dancers, exotic dancers, strippers, male or female impersonators in presence of minors."

Public reactions
The bill sparked outrage nationwide. In response to the law's signing, White House Press Secretary Karine Jean-Pierre stated, "Instead of doing anything to address the real issues that are impacting American people, right now you have a governor from Tennessee that has decided to go after drag shows. What sense does that make to go after drag shows? How is that going to help people's lives?"

RuPaul called the bill a distraction, stating in an Instagram post, that it was "a classic distraction technique, distracting us away from the real issues that they were voted into office to focus on: jobs, health care, keeping our children safe from harm at their own school."

See also
 2022 drag performance protests
 LGBT rights in Tennessee

References

External links
 Tennessee Senate Bill 3
 Senate Bill 3: History, details, and related video from the Tennessee legislative sessions

Anti-drag sentiment
Tennessee General Assembly
LGBT culture in Tennessee
2023 in LGBT history
LGBT law in the United States
2023 controversies in the United States
Transgender law in the United States
2023 in Tennessee
LGBT-related controversies in the United States